Daniel Rauicava (born 5 October 1986) is an Australian former professional rugby league footballer who played for the Canterbury-Bankstown Bulldogs in the NRL. Rauicava made his NRL debut in round 23 against the Canberra Raiders. Rauicava's junior club was the Menai Roosters.

References

External links 
 Daniel Rauicava Bulldogs profile
 Bulldogs fans form

1986 births
Fijian rugby league players
Canterbury-Bankstown Bulldogs players
Living people
Rugby league centres
Australian people of I-Taukei Fijian descent